Alexis Alégué Elandi (born 23 December 1996) is a Cameroonian professional footballer who plays as a striker for MFK Vyškov.

Club career
Alégué made his Ligue 1 debut with FC Nantes on 4 November 2015 against OGC Nice in a 1–2 away win. He managed to score his first league goal in his first appearance.

On 31 December 2019, Alégué joined Rodez AF on a deal until the end of the season.

International career
Alégué was born in Cameroon and moved to France at a young age. He is a youth international for France. He then represented the Cameroon U23s in a 3–2 win over the Morocco U23s in October 2016, wherein he scored the opening goal.

References

External links

1996 births
Living people
Cameroonian footballers
Association football forwards
Cameroon youth international footballers
French footballers
France youth international footballers
French sportspeople of Cameroonian descent
AC Boulogne-Billancourt players
FC Nantes players
Tours FC players
Rodez AF players
Ligue 1 players
Ligue 2 players
Championnat National players
Championnat National 2 players
Championnat National 3 players
MFK Vyškov players
Czech National Football League players
Expatriate footballers in the Czech Republic